The 1941 Davidson Wildcats football team was an American football team that represented Davidson University as a member of the Southern Conference during the 1941 college football season. In their sixth season under head coach Gene McEver, the Wildcats compiled a 1–6–3 record (1–5–2 against SoCon opponents), finished 13th in the conference, and were outscored by a total of 176 to 63. The team was shut out in five of its ten games. Home games were played at Richardson Stadium in Davidson, North Carolina.

McEver was later inducted into the College Football Hall of Fame.

Schedule

References

Davidson
Davidson Wildcats football seasons
Davidson Wildcats football